A New Day Has Come is the third one-off American television special by Canadian singer Celine Dion that was broadcast by CBS on 7 April 2002. The special was a promotion for Dion's first English album in 2 years of the same name, A New Day Has Come. It also marks as Dion's comeback after her 2-year hiatus from the music industry. The special was filmed on 2 March 2002 at the Kodak Theatre in Los Angeles, California. It featured Dion (backed by her touring band) performing songs from the album as well as some of her greatest hits. She was also joined by special guests Grammy winning R&B singing sensations Destiny's Child and Brian McKnight.

The special also featured a private one on one interview with Dion about her return to the music industry and her experience on 11 September 2001.

Set list
 "A New Day Has Come"
 "I'm Alive"
 "Acoustic Movie Medley: "Because You Loved Me" / Beauty and the Beast" (with Brian McKnight) / "My Heart Will Go On"
 "Have You Ever Been In Love"
 "Emotion" (with Destiny's Child)
 "When The Wrong One Loves You Right" (with Destiny's Child)
 "At Last" (with violinist Roddy Chiong)
 "Nature Boy"

Additional songs were also performed during the concert but were not aired in the broadcast
 "Aun Existe Amor"
 "Goodbye's (The Saddest Word)"
 "Ten Days"

References

2002 television specials
2000s American television specials
CBS television specials
Musical television specials
Celine Dion